Richard Arthur Carty (28 July 1922 – 31 March 1984) was an English cricketer. Carty was a right-handed batsman who bowled right-arm fast-medium.

Carty made his first-class debut for Hampshire against Oxford University in the 1949 season. On debut Carty scored his maiden first-class half century with a score of 53 as well as taking 5/47 in the Universities second innings. Carty's County Championship debut came a match later against Warwickshire. Carty played ten matches for Hampshire in the 1949 season, taking 34 wickets at a bowling average of 25.82, with three five wicket hauls and best figures of 6/110.

The following season Carty played 15 first-class matches for Hampshire, this time taking 31 wickets at a bowling average of 33.29, with best figures of 4/34. In the 1951 season Carty took his career best figures of 7/29 against Oxford University and the following season he followed it up with 7/50 against Glamorgan, a match which gave Carty his only haul of ten wickets in a match.

After quiet seasons with the ball in 1951 and 1952, Carty took 30 wickets at a bowling average of 23.26, with best figures of 6-24. The following season Carty played only three first-class matches for Hampshire, with his final first-class match for the county coming against Glamorgan at the County Ground, Southampton.

Carty played 55 first-class matches for Hampshire during which he scored 798 runs at a batting average of 14.77, with two half centuries and a high score of 53. With the ball Carty took 138 wickets at a bowling average of 30.17, with eight five wicket hauls and best figures of 7/29. In the field, Carty took 24 catches.

Carty died at Bishop's Waltham, Hampshire on 31 March 1984.

External links
Richard Carty at Cricinfo
Richard Carty at CricketArchive
Matches and detailed statistics for Richard Carty

1922 births
1984 deaths
Cricketers from Southampton
English cricketers
Hampshire cricketers